Bobby Joe Green (May 7, 1936 – May 28, 1993) was an American professional football player who was a punter and running back in the National Football League (NFL) for fourteen seasons during the 1960s and early 1970s.  Green played college football for the Florida Gators, and thereafter, he played professionally for the Pittsburgh Steelers and the Chicago Bears of the NFL.

Early life 

Green was born in Vernon, Texas in 1936.  He attended College High School in Bartlesville, Oklahoma, and he played high school football for the College High Wildcats.

College career 

Green accepted an athletic scholarship to attend the University of Florida in Gainesville, Florida, where he was a punter and halfback for coach Bob Woodruff's Gators teams from 1958 and 1959.  As a senior in 1959, he kicked fifty-four punts for an average distance of 44.9 yards—still the Gators' single-season record.  Woodruff ranked him and Don Chandler as the Gators' best kickers of the 1950s.  His 82-yard punt against the Georgia Bulldogs in 1958 remains the longest punt by a Gator in the modern era.  Green was also a sprinter and high jumper on the Florida Gators track and field team.  He was later inducted into the University of Florida Athletic Hall of Fame as a "Gator Great."

Green also appeared on Oklahoma's 1956 National Championship roster.

Professional career 

Green was selected in the ninth round (102nd pick overall) of the 1959 NFL Draft by the San Francisco 49ers, and played fourteen seasons for the Pittsburgh Steelers and the Chicago Bears. Green was a member of the Bears' 1963 NFL Championship team, and was selected to the Pro Bowl after the  season. Green was one of the last NFL players to play without a face mask and can be seen doing so in the late 1960s.

During his fourteen-season NFL career, Green appeared in 187 games, kicking 970 punts for 41,317 yards (an average of 42.6 yards per kick).  He also completed six of ten passing attempts for 103 yards.

Life after the NFL 

Green returned to Gainesville, Florida after his professional football career ended, and started a specialty advertising business.  Green also served as a volunteer kicking coach for the Florida Gators under head football coaches Charley Pell and Galen Hall from 1979 to 1989. In May of 2019 Green was rated #97 on the Chicago Bears top 100 list.

Green died as a result of a heart attack in his Gainesville home on the morning of May 28, 1993; he was 57 years old.  He was survived by his wife Martha Jane and their son and daughter.

See also 

 Florida Gators football, 1950–59
 List of Chicago Bears players
 List of Florida Gators in the NFL Draft
 List of Pittsburgh Steelers players
 List of University of Florida alumni
 List of University of Florida Athletic Hall of Fame members

References

Bibliography 

 Carlson, Norm, University of Florida Football Vault: The History of the Florida Gators, Whitman Publishing, LLC, Atlanta, Georgia (2007).  .
 Golenbock, Peter, Go Gators!  An Oral History of Florida's Pursuit of Gridiron Glory, Legends Publishing, LLC, St. Petersburg, Florida (2002).  .
 Hairston, Jack, Tales from the Gator Swamp: A Collection of the Greatest Gator Stories Ever Told, Sports Publishing, LLC, Champaign, Illinois (2002).  .
 McCarthy, Kevin M.,  Fightin' Gators: A History of University of Florida Football, Arcadia Publishing, Mount Pleasant, South Carolina (2000).  .
 McEwen, Tom, The Gators: A Story of Florida Football, The Strode Publishers, Huntsville, Alabama (1974).  .

1936 births
1993 deaths
American football punters
Oklahoma Sooners football players
Chicago Bears players
Florida Gators football coaches
Florida Gators football players
Florida Gators men's track and field athletes
National Conference Pro Bowl players
People from Vernon, Texas
Pittsburgh Steelers players
Players of American football from Oklahoma
Track and field athletes from Oklahoma
Track and field athletes in the National Football League